James Kenneth "Jay" O'Brien, Jr. (born December 10, 1951) was a Republican member of the Virginia Senate, representing the 39th district from 2003 through 2007. Previously represented the 40th district in the Virginia House of Delegates from 1993 through 2002. O'Brien was defeated in his bid for re-election in 2007, losing in a close race to Democrat George Barker.

Biography 
O'Brien was born in Nuremberg, Germany on December 10, 1951 to Jim and Mary O'Brien. Along with his father and two brothers, Dennis and Michael, he attended the United States Military Academy and graduated in 1973. He then went on to graduate school at University of Oklahoma where he mastered in Public Administration.

External links
Senate of Virginia - Senator James Kenneth 'Jay' O'Brien Jr. official government site
Project Vote Smart - Senator James Kenneth 'Jay' O'Brien Jr. (VA) profile
Follow the Money - James Kenneth 'Jay' O'Brien Jr.
2005 2003 2001 1999 campaign contributions
Washington Post - Senate District 39 Race

Virginia state senators
Members of the Virginia House of Delegates
1951 births
Living people
20th-century American politicians
21st-century American politicians
University of Oklahoma alumni